Feliks Leparsky (1875 – 10 January 1917) was a Russian fencer. He competed in the individual foil event at the 1912 Summer Olympics. He served as a captain in the Russian army and was killed during World War I.

See also
 List of Olympians killed in World War I

References

1875 births
1917 deaths
Male fencers from the Russian Empire
Olympic competitors for the Russian Empire
Fencers at the 1912 Summer Olympics
Russian military personnel killed in World War I
Imperial Russian Army personnel